Dhakna Badola is a village situated in Champawat Tehsil and located in Champawat district of Uttarakhand, India. It is one of 203 villages in the Champawat block along with Devalnath, Nathbohara.

Mythology 

It is believed that goddess Chandi had blessed this village to secure villagers from fear of devil’s attack. To uphold her word goddess Chandika killed several asurs and scattered their dead bodies in all over the village so that whole place was covered (dhak) with asurs corpse for a long period. Thus, the village name as Dhakna.

History 

Dhakna was the village under the formerly rulers of the Chand dynasty. Their capital was Champawat. The famous "ek hatiya naula" was built by a Chand ruler. However, there are no historical manuscript are found which date this monument.

Geography 

This village is situated in the Himalayan foothills and has an average elevation of 1600 m. It is nearby village of Champawat  which is 2 km from district headquarters.  Its weather is the same as north India’s weather, but it slightly receives snow fall in the winter season. Summer is mild. Pine, oak, buransh (rhododendron), kafal (myrica esculenta) deodar are the mostly common flora of this region.

Demographics 

As of the 2001 India Census, Dhakna Badola has a population of 530. Male constitute 263 and the female population is 259.

Culture and tradition 
Natives of the village are Kumaonis . The dances of the region are connected to its state tradition which is Choliya and hori. Music is also integral part of village cultural, these folks songs are played on instrument dhol, damaun, masakbeen. Jaagar is a way to worship god, also use for invoke god. Many historical heritage are found such as chandal-kot and ek hatiya naula. Beautiful worked painting and murals are used to decorate homes and temples. Old houses were made of deodar tree which is a good example of architecturally of this place. Many local deities are worshipped and festivals are organized each year. Harela, uttrayani (ghugti tyar), Janamastmi-Dola are festivals.

References

External links 
 
 http://champawat.nic.in/
 http://www.populationofindia.co.in/uttarakhand/champawat/champawat/.dhakna-badola

Villages in Champawat district